Poviliūnas is a Lithuanian surname. Notable people with the surname include:
 (born 1927), Lithuanian economist, professor
, chairman of the National Olympic Committee of Lithuania 

Lithuanian-language surnames